Sêrxü County, also known as Sershul, Dzachuka,  Serxu, or Shiqu is a county of the Garzê Tibetan Autonomous Prefecture in the northwest of Sichuan Province, China, bordering Qinghai to the west and the Tibet Autonomous Region to the southwest.

Geography

Serxu (sershul) County is situated at the northwest corner of Sichuan province, and is also the westernmost county-level division of the province.
It is above  km² et and mainly covered by grasslands. Average level above sea is 4,200 m.

It has an area of over 25,000 square kilometers and is predominantly covered by grasslands used for nomadic herding. The population is around 68,000, 96% of whom are ethnic Tibetan.

By the end of 1997, there was an estimated livestock population of 581,470.  These were mainly yaks, sheep, goats, and horses, but there was a small number of pigs. The human population of Shiqu County was approximately 63,400, 96.8% of which were ethnic Tibetans.  There were 49,100 herdsmen, representing 77.6% of the population.

Sershul District villages include: Ariksar, Bumser, Changma, Dezhongma, Dzagyel, Geming, Gotsa, Junyung, Jowo, Kabshi, Kilung, Kyewu, Sershul Gompa, Serxu Dzong, Shaksa, Tromsa Genma, Tseboum Soumdo, Tsemkhog, Ombo and Wathul.

Sershul District has several monasteries, including: Ju Mohar, Sershul Monastery, Bumser Gonpo, Ariksar, Dzagyel, Changma, Trikar, Kabshi and Jowo; and the Gsumge Mani Stone Castle, a religious complex built out of mani stone tablets.

Demography
The population of the district was  inhabitants in 1999.

There are about  nomads in the district, i.e. 77,6% of the population.

Climate

References

External links
 maps of Sershul County
 Development Projects in Sershul
  Page descriptive - 
 County Police Bureau
 County News
 photos of Sershul
 County Justice Bureau
 County Buddhism Academy
 County Water Resources Bureau

County-level divisions of Sichuan
Populated places in the Garzê Tibetan Autonomous Prefecture